Wingo is a ghost town located in Sonoma County, California in the United States. It can be found on older maps as a dot along the sloughs of Sonoma Creek, south of Sonoma and Schellville, and west of Buchli.

History

Wingo was a steamship station known as Norfolk until 1879 when it was given the name Wingo by the Railroad. Now a ghost town of a few barns, cabins, and a train trestle, it was once a bustling town that served as a stop for steamer passengers from San Francisco.

The Northwestern Pacific right of way runs through the town. Just before it enters Wingo, it crosses a manual, chain-operated drawbridge that is planked for both cars and trains to cross.

Land use

Formerly open to tidal action, the area was diked to create agricultural lands. During winter rains natural seasonal ponds are created.  Since this area is on a major migration route for many species of birds, efforts are being made to create more seasonal and permanent freshwater ponds and to plant crops and grasses for wildlife.

Wildlife

Wildlife that can be seen in and around Wingo include golden eagles, American kestrels, red-tailed hawks, Northern harriers, owls, California quail, ring-necked pheasant, bitterns, turkey vultures, coyotes, cottontail rabbit, shorebirds, ducks, kingfishers, herons, egrets, mourning doves, woodpeckers, swallows, songbirds and others.

In Popular Culture 
Wingo has been referenced in at least two songs. Norton Buffalo attempted to popularize the town through his song "High Tide in Wingo", and then with Roy Rogers in "Ain't no Bread in the Breadbox", whose music video was filmed in Wingo.

References

Ghost towns in the San Francisco Bay Area
Historic districts in California
Former settlements in Sonoma County, California